Feng Boxuan (born 18 March 1997) is a Chinese footballer who currently plays for Chinese Super League team Henan Songshan Longmen.

Club career
Feng Boxuan moved aboard in 2013 and joined Portuguese side Oriental Dragon, who was founded by capital of China. He signed for Campeonato de Portugal side Torreense in October 2015 and was promoted to their first team in December 2015. He made his senior debut on 6 December 2015 in a 1–0 away defeat against Real, coming on as a substitute for Liu Junshuai in the 76th minute. On 20 December 2015, he scored his first senior goal in his third appearances for the club against Sacavenense, which Torreense won 2–0. He scored another goal of the season on 10 January 2016 in a 3–0 home win against Coruchense. Feng made 14 league appearances for Torreense in his second season with the club. On 13 November 2016, he scored his first goal of the season in a 1–0 away win against Vilafranquense. His second goal came on 27 November 2016 in a 4–1 home win against Angrense.

Feng transferred to Chinese Super League side Guangzhou Evergrande in July 2017. On 19 July 2017, he made his debut for the club in a 4–2 defeat against Guangzhou R&F at Yuexiushan Stadium in the first leg of 2017 Chinese FA Cup fifth round, coming on as a substitute for Yu Hanchao in the 73rd minute. On 10 August 2017, he made his Super League debut in a 3–0 away win against Liaoning FC as the benefit of the new rule of the league that at least one Under-23 player must be in the starting line-up and was substituted off by Yu Hanchao in the 22nd minute. He would go on to establish himself as a squad player within the team as the club won the 2019 Chinese Super League.

Career statistics
.

Honours

Club
Guangzhou Evergrande
Chinese Super League: 2017, 2019
Chinese FA Super Cup: 2018

References

External links
 

1997 births
Living people
Chinese footballers
Footballers from Wuhan
S.C.U. Torreense players
Guangzhou F.C. players
Henan Songshan Longmen F.C. players
Segunda Divisão players
Chinese Super League players
Association football midfielders
Chinese expatriate footballers
Expatriate footballers in Portugal
Chinese expatriate sportspeople in Portugal